Stratford High School is  a secondary school in Stratford, Taranaki, New Zealand. It is the only co-educational high school in the Stratford District.

History
Stratford District High School was established in 1897. Between 1922 and 1966, the school operated as Stratford Technical High School, and since 1966, it has been known as Stratford High School.

Background
The school uniform is a white shirt, red jersey and black shorts/trousers for seniors or a black shirt, Black and red jersey and grey shorts/skirts for juniors, plus black shoes.

Stratford High School consists of four houses, Amess (red), McAllister (yellow), Trimble (green) and Tyrer (blue).

Although being considered a small school, Stratford High participates in many extra-curricular programs, including a school production, participation in the Smokefree Stage Challenge, many sports teams, cross-country, athletics and swimming sports events, and many art and culture events.

Stratford High School has a prominently strong Kapa Haka group that are involved in local competitions in the region. Having introduced the school haka in 2011, it is used in welcoming and sporting events. Students are involved in a wide range of musical activities such as the Variety concert and the annual Stratford Lion's Awards.

Notable alumni

 Mark "Bull" Allen (born 1967), rugby union player, TV celebrity
 Donald Cameron (1887–1947), rugby union player
 Alice Copping (1906 – 1996) senior lecturer in nutrition, Queen Elizabeth College, University of London.
 Brian Davis (1934–1998), Anglican bishop
 Gavin Hill (born 1965), rugby union and rugby league player
 Alfred Kivell (1897–1987), rugby union player
 Harold Masters (1895–1980), rugby union player
 Jeremiah Trueman (born 1987), basketball player
 Murray Watts (born 1955), rugby union player
 Toss Woollaston (1910–1998), painter

References

External links 
 Official Stratford High School website

Educational institutions established in 1897
Secondary schools in Taranaki
Stratford, New Zealand
1897 establishments in New Zealand